Penthides modestus is a species of beetle in the family Cerambycidae. It was described by Tippmann in 1955. It is known from China.

References

Desmiphorini
Beetles described in 1955